The IFA Horch H3, also known as IFA H3, is a short bonnet lorry, and the first series production vehicle by East German VEB HORCH Kraftfahrzeug- und Motorenwerke Zwickau, later known as VEB Sachsenring Automobilwerke Zwickau. The short-lived H3 was produced from 1947 to 1949 in Zwickau (then Soviet occupation zone); 852 were produced. Several parts used in the H3, most notably the engine, were originally intended to be used for Sd.Kfz. 11 half tracks.

Technical description 

The IFA Horch H3 is a 3 tonne, two-axle, front engine, rear-wheel drive lorry with a short bonnet. It has a U-profile ladder frame, and leaf sprung axles. The front axle is a rigid dead, the rear axle a rigid live axle. 7.5—20 inch tyres were fitted; the braking system is fully mechanical. A double-disc dry clutch transmits the torque from the six-cylinder Maybach Hl42 otto engine to the five-speed unsynchronised Prometheus gearbox. In its highest gear, the H3 can reach a top speed of 65 km/h.

Engine specifications
Engine: Maybach Hl42, straight-six otto, water-cooled
Fuel system: Downdraught carburetter
Bore×Stoke, displacement: 90×110 mm, 4198 cm3
Rater power:  at 3000/min
Source:

References

External links 

IFA vehicles